Delville may refer to:

Places
 Deville, Alberta, a locality in Canada
 Dellville, Pennsylvania, United States
 Delville House, country house in Glasnevin, Ireland

Other uses
 Battle of Delville Wood, an engagement in the 1916 Battle of the Somme in the First World War
 Delville Wood South African National Memorial, a World War I memorial
 Delville Wood Cemetery, a cemetery located near Longueval, France

People with the surname Delville
 Jean Delville (1867–1953), Belgian symbolist painter, writer, and occultist
 Jean-Pierre Delville, (born 1951), Belgian Catholic bishop of Liège
 Michel Delville (born 1969), Belgian musician, writer and teacher